James Alexander Wedderburn "Hamish" St. Clair-Erskine (23 August 1909 – 17 December 1973) was an English aristocrat aesthete. He was engaged to Nancy Mitford.

Early life
James Alexander Wedderburn nicknamed "Hamish" was the son of James St Clair-Erskine, 5th Earl of Rosslyn (1869–1939). His siblings were Mary St Clair-Erskine Dunn Campbell McCabe Dunn (1912–1993), Rosabelle St Clair-Erskine (1891–1956) and Francis St Clair-Erskine, Lord Loughborough (1892–1929).

At Eton College, St Clair-Erskine was the lover of Tom Mitford.  He attended Oxford University, where he was friends with English poet Sir John Betjeman. In the Letters edited by Betjeman's daughter, Candida Lycett Green, and published in 1996, she remembers how her father and St. Clair-Erskine "went out in fast cars, driving all night in the flat country near Coolham". According to James Lees-Milne's diaries: "At Oxford he had the most enchanting looks – mischievous, twinkling eyes, slanting eyebrows. He was slight of build, well dressed, gay as gay, always snobbish however, and terribly conscious of his nobility [...] the toast of the university." At Oxford he was friends with Evelyn Waugh.

Career
He fought in the World War II, became a Major in the Coldstream Guards, escaping from a prison camp and walking through Italy to join the Allied troops. He was awarded a Military Cross in 1943.

In 1969, together with Anthony Rhodes, he translated Tapestries by Mercedes Viale Ferrero.

He was the dame de compagnie (lady's companion) to Daisy Fellowes and Enid Kenmare.

Personal life
Hamish St. Clair-Erskine was gay, but nevertheless, Nancy Mitford fell in love with him, and it was due to this unrequited love that she attempted suicide and wrote her first novel, Highland Fling: the male lead is based upon St. Clair-Erskine.

In the 1920s he was friends with Aileen Sibell Mary Guinness and the Hon. Brinsley Sheridan Bushe Plunket and was guest at Luttrellstown Castle, County Dublin.

He was good friends with Patrick Leigh Fermor and his wife Joan: in the 1940s the three of them drove down through France and Italy, and later Joan accompanied Peter Quennell and St. Clair-Erskine to Sicily where she took photographs for an article Quennell was writing.

At St. Clair-Erskine's death in 1973, Alan Payan Pryce-Jones described him as a "bright apparition who once upon a time swept past them like a kingfisher: all colour and sparkle and courage [...] [he found] small place in a world which turned away from an unambitious charmer whose only enduring gift was his charm".

Legacy
Adrian Maurice Daintrey painted his portrait, sold by Christie's on 25 August 2005.

References

External links
 

1909 births
1973 deaths
Gay men
People educated at Eton College
Alumni of the University of Oxford
Recipients of the Military Cross
Younger sons of earls
British Army personnel of World War II
Coldstream Guards officers
British World War II prisoners of war
World War II prisoners of war held by Italy